is a Japanese voice actress, singer and model. She worked at the Holy Peak talent agency until 2018. She is represented by With Line since February 2019. In July 2019, she transferred to PUGNUS. She married baseball catcher Kenya Wakatsuki on December 28, 2019.

Biography

Filmography

Anime
The Idolmaster Cinderella Girls - Sae Kobayakawa 
Shomin Sample - Reiko Arisugawa
Ange Vierge - Code Ω77 Stella
Scorching Ping Pong Girls - Sachiko Sasorida
Kemono Friends - African Wild Dog
Chou Yuu Sekai: Being the Reality - Hakuu
Between the Sky and Sea - Namino Murakami
Joshi Kausei - Momoko Futo
Hachigatsu no Cinderella Nine - Aoi Asada
The Island of Giant Insects - Naruse Chitose
Princess Connect! Re:Dive - Kiruya Momochi
Assault Lily Bouquet - Ena Banshōya
Girls' Frontline - Super SASS
Saving 80,000 Gold in Another World for My Retirement - Colette
Liar Liar - Noa Akizuki

Video games
Idol Death Game TV – Hime Asahikawa
Tokyo 7th Sisters – Kazumi Katsuragi
The Idolmaster Cinderella Girls – Sae Kobayakawa
Kobayashi ga Kawai Sugite Tsurai!! Game Demo Kyun Moe MAX  – Shizuka-Chan 
Aegis of Earth: Protonovus Assault
Nekomimi Survival! – Setsuna,Yaya,Stella
Magia Record (2018) – Ria Ami
Food Fantasy (2018) – Bibimbap
Granblue Fantasy – Yuisis, Kyaru
Girls' Frontline – Super SASS, MK48
Princess Connect! Re:Dive – Kyaru
Crash Fever - Sima Qian
Azur Lane – RN Carabiniere, KMS August Von Parseval
Street Fighter V – Lucia
Arknights – Plume, Gravel
Senran Kagura Peach Beach Splash – Yuyaki
Kick-Flight – Ruriha
Alchemy Stars (2022) – Rinne
Two Jong Cell!! (2022) – Sazanka Rikugien
A Certain Magical Index: Imaginary Fest (2022) – Dion Fortune
Towa Tsugai (2023) – Hakuchou

Drama CD
Saint Seiya: Saintia Shō - Ruin no Ate

References

External links
 Official agency profile 
 
 

1987 births
Living people
Voice actresses from Hiroshima
Japanese women pop singers
Japanese television personalities
Japanese video game actresses
Japanese voice actresses
21st-century Japanese actresses
21st-century Japanese singers
21st-century Japanese women singers